Ronald S. Barak (born June 7, 1943) is an American gymnast. At the 1961 Maccabiah Games he won eight gold medals, one silver medal, and one bronze medal. At the 1964 NCAA Men's Gymnastics Championships he won the all-around competition, the horizontal bars, and the parallel bars, and at the 1964 Amateur Athletic Union (AAU) National Gymnastics Competition he was the champion in the horizontal bars. He competed in eight events at the 1964 Summer Olympics.

Early and personal life
Barak was born in Los Angeles, California, and is Jewish. He attended Louis Pasteur Junior High School in West Los Angeles, and Alexander Hamilton High School in Los Angeles.

He then attended the University of Southern California (USC; B.S. with honors in physics, '64), and was awarded USC's Athlete of the Year Award in 1964. Barak also attended the University of Southern California Law School (J.D., '68), and became a partner at, chairman of the real estate section of, and co-managing partner of the law firm of Paul, Hastings, Janofsky & Walker, and was later a partner at the law firm of Manatt, Phelps & Phillips.

He authored the mystery novel A Season For Redemption (2010), and a novel, The Amendment Killer, a political thriller published in November 2017. He lives in Pacific Palisades, California.

Gymnastics career
In 1960 Barak was the LA City Schools horizontal bar champion.

Barak competed for the US in gymnastics at the 1961 Maccabiah Games, winning eight gold medals (including two in the rings, and two in the high bar), one silver medal, and one bronze medal.

In 1962, Barak led the USC Trojans to a National Collegiate Athletics Association (NCAA) title in gymnastics, and won the all-around in the Big 6 Conference. He sat out 1963 with injuries.

At the 1964 NCAA Men's Gymnastics Championships, Barak won three individual titles—the all-around competition, the horizontal bars, and the parallel bars. At the 1964 Amateur Athletic Union (AAU) National Gymnastics Competition, he was the champion in the horizontal bars. He was named a National Association of Gymnastics Coaches First Team All-American in all-around, high bar, and parallel bars.

Barak was a member of the United States men's national gymnastics team that placed seventh in the team combined exercise competition at the 1964 Tokyo Olympics. He was 25th in the rings, 31st in the horizontal bars, 39th in the all-around competition out of 130 competitors, 45th in the parallel bars, 54th in the floor exercise, 67th in the pommel horse, and 95th in the vault.

From 1965 to 1968, while attending law school he was head coach of the USC Trojans varsity gymnastics team. In 1967 Barak was the coach of the United States gymnastics team that won a silver medal in the 1967 World University Games.

Halls of Fame
In 1990, Barak was inducted into the Southern California Jewish Sports Hall of Fame. In 1995 he was inducted into the U.S. Gymnastics Hall of Fame. In 2017 he was inducted into the Los Angeles City Schools Hall of Fame.

References

External links
 

1943 births
Living people
Jewish gymnasts
Jewish American sportspeople
Competitors at the 1961 Maccabiah Games
Maccabiah Games medalists in gymnastics
Maccabiah Games gold medalists for the United States
Maccabiah Games silver medalists for the United States
Maccabiah Games bronze medalists for the United States
USC Trojans athletes
USC Trojans coaches
USC Gould School of Law alumni
Paul Hastings partners
American male artistic gymnasts
Olympic gymnasts of the United States
Gymnasts at the 1964 Summer Olympics
Gymnasts from Los Angeles
Real property lawyers
Lawyers from Los Angeles
Jewish American attorneys
Jewish American novelists
21st-century American Jews